Cockthorpe is a village and former civil parish, now in the parish of Binham, in the North Norfolk district, in the county of Norfolk, England. In 1931 the parish had a population of 55. On 1 April 1935 the parish was abolished and merged with Binham.

The village is close to the North Norfolk coast and the villages of Stiffkey, Blakeney and Morston. The village has a small church which is called All Saints and has a 14th-century tower. The church is now disused.

The nearest railway station is at Sheringham for the Bittern Line which runs between Sheringham, Cromer and Norwich. The nearest airport is Norwich International Airport.

History
The village's name is of mixed Viking and Anglo-Saxon origin and derives from an amalgamation of the Old Norse and Old English for a outlying farmstead or settlement with an abundance of either chickens or gamebirds.

In the Domesday Book, Cockthorpe is recorded as a settlement of 5 households in the hundred of Greenhoe. The village formed parts of William de Beaufeu.

Between 1940 and 1961, Cockthorpe was host to RAF Langham, a satellite airfield for RAF Bircham Newton operated by RAF Coastal Command.

Geography
Cockthorpe falls within the constituency of North Norfolk and is represented at Parliament by Duncan Baker MP of the Conservative Party.

All Saints' Church
Cockthorpe's parish church is of Norman origin and was significantly rebuilt in the Fifteenth and Nineteenth Centuries.

Notable residents
Sir Cloudesley Shovell, the distinguished seafarer, was born in Cockthorpe. 
Sir Henry Gough, 1st Baronet, Member of Parliament, (1709–74) was made a Baronet in the Baronetage of the United Kingdom in 1728. He married into the Calthorpe family, descendants of the Calthorpes who held the manors of Cockthorpe, Norfolk, and Ampton, Suffolk, and who were also sometime Lords of the Manor of Edgbaston. The Fess Ermine in Birmingham's coat of arms is a reference to the arms of the Calthorpe family.
Christopher Calthorpe, emigrated to Virginia, arriving 1622 (represented Elizabeth City County and York County in House of Burgesses).http://www.encyclopediavirginia.org/Calthorpe_Christopher_ca_1560-1763#start_entry

References
in popular media:

 Hunter : The Parenting- Bruva Alfabusa, episode 1, YouTube  (original upload in january 2022)

Villages in Norfolk
Former civil parishes in Norfolk
North Norfolk